Dafen is an electoral ward, representing the immediate area around the village of Dafen in the community of Llanelli Rural, Carmarthenshire, Wales.

Profile
In 2014, the Dafen electoral ward had an electorate of 2,665. The total population was 3,615, of whom 84.6% were born in Wales. 26.9% of the population were able to speak Welsh.

Representation
Dafan is a ward to Llanelli Rural Council, electing four community councillors.

The Dafen Ward is a single-member ward for the purposes of Carmarthenshire County Council elections. Since 2012 it has been represented by Labour Party councilor Tegwen Devichand.

Recent history
The first election to the new unitary Carmarthenshire County Council took place in 1995. Dafen Ward was won by the Labour Party candidate, Vernon Warlow, who defeated a sitting member of Llanelli Borough Council.

 

At the 1999, Warlow was re-elected despite a strong showing by Plaid Cymru which won the Llanelli seat in the inaugural Welsh Assembly elections held on the same day.

 

Labour again held the seat in 2004. Tegwen Devichand was elected at a by-election following the death of the previous councillor, Vernon Warlow.

 

Labour again held the seat in 2008.

 

In 2012, Labour retained the seat.
Labour won by a large majority although Plaid Cymru's vote may have been affected by the decision of their former candidate, Clem Thomas, to stand for People First.

Earlier History

County Council Elections
The long-standing ward boundaries in the Llanelli area were redrawn in the 1980s and Dafen ward was part of the Felinfoel ward for the purposes of election to Dyfed County Council in 1989 and 1993.

When the current Carmarthenshire County Council was formed in 1995, Dafen became a ward in its own.

District Council Elections
From 1987, Dafen formed an electoral ward for the purposes of elections to Llanelli Borough Council. Dafen returned two members.

External links

References

Carmarthenshire electoral wards
Llanelli Rural